Tricameralism is the practice of having three legislative or parliamentary chambers. It is contrasted with unicameralism and bicameralism, each of which is far more common.

Varieties of tricameralism

A disputed type of tricameralism is one where there are two legislative bodies, elected or appointed separately, and a third consisting of all members of the two, meeting together. In cases where this is considered tricameralism, such as the Manx Tynwald and the Icelandic Althing (from 1874 to 1991), there is generally an explicit, routine role for the unified house, which distinguishes it from bicameral systems where a joint sitting of the two bodies is used to resolve deadlocks or for special sessions, which is true in several parliaments including Australia, Switzerland and India. Arguments over whether tricameralism should be construed to include this or not are primarily semantic.

Less ambiguous examples in which three bodies each are chosen separately and meet and debate separately have also existed. The word could describe the Ancien Régime era French Estates-General, though similar semantic argument are applied since it sometimes met in joint session. The South African Parliament established under the apartheid regime's 1983 constitution was tricameral, as was the Chinese 1947 Constitution and Simón Bolívar's model state. A common feature in these bodies, which also casts some doubt on the appropriateness of the name, is that in several cases one of the three legislatures is not principally concerned with legislating.

No national government is currently organized along tricameral lines.

Icelandic tricameralism
Once the Icelandic Parliament was restored by royal decree in 1844, it originally operated unicamerally from 1845 to 1874 when it became principally bicameral with an additional third chamber, known as Unified Parliament. The third chamber consisted of the union of the other two and deliberated as a single body, which makes some scholars classify it as only a bicameral system. However, the third chamber did have its own speaker distinct from the speakers for the other two chambers:

Neðri deild, the Lower Chamber was coequal to the upper chamber. Its members were elected by the electorate.
Efri deild, the Upper Chamber was coequal to the lower chamber. Half its members were originally appointed by the King of Denmark and had veto power until 1915 when all its members were elected by the electorate.
Sameinað Alþingi, Unified Parliament. Its members were those of the lower and upper chambers. The third chamber originally only dealt with contentious matters but soon established its own standing committees and starting in 1934, the third chamber had an exclusive role in amending and passing the annual budget bill. As the decades passed the third chamber took over many of the responsibilities of the lower and upper chambers.

The Icelandic Parliament followed the legislatures of Denmark and Sweden and became unicameral once more in 1991.

South African tricameralism

In 1983, South Africa's apartheid government put forward a constitution providing for a tricameral legislature. On 2 November, around seventy percent of the country's white population voted in favour of the changesblack South Africans were not consulted – and under the proposal they continued to be denied representation since in theory they were citizens of independent or autonomous Bantustans.

The South African tricameral parliament consisted of three race-based chambers:

 House of Assembly178 members, reserved for whites
 House of Representatives85 members, reserved for Coloured, or mixed-race, people
 House of Delegates45 members, reserved for Indians

The creation of the tricameral parliament was controversial on two fronts. On the one hand, many white conservatives disliked the idea of non-whites participating in Parliament at all. The dispute was a factor in the creation of the Conservative Party, a breakaway from the dominant National Party. On the other hand, many people of color and Asians rejected the system as a sham, saying that the chambers reserved for them were powerless.

The tricameral parliament was not particularly strong. The 1983 constitution significantly weakened the powers of parliament and abolished the position of Prime Minister. Most authorities were transferred to the State President, including the power to appoint the Cabinet. This was seen by many as an attempt to limit the power of coloureds and Indiansnot only were the 'non-white' Houses of Parliament less powerful than the 'white' one, but parliament itself was subordinate to a white President.

Bolívar's tricameralism
Simón Bolívar, the South American revolutionary leader, included a tricameral legislature as part of his proposals for a model government. Bolívar described the three houses as follows:

 Chamber of Tribunes, holding powers relating to government finance, foreign affairs, and war. The tribunes would, unlike the other two houses, be popularly elected.
 Senate, an apolitical body holding powers to enact law, supervise the judiciary, and appoint regional officials. Bolívar believed that the senate should be hereditary, saying that this was the only way to ensure its neutrality. There are parallels between Bolívar's Senate and other chambers such as the British House of Lords.
 Censors, a group who would act as a check against the powers of the other two. Bolívar described them as "prosecuting attorneys against the government in defense of the Constitution and popular rights". He also said that they should ensure that the executive was functioning satisfactorily, perhaps having powers of impeachment.

Bolívar intended his model government to function as a parliamentary system, and so the tricameral parliament was expected to govern through the active administration of the cabinet ministers who would be accountable to it. Bolívar was explicit in many of his writings, particularly in his Message to the Congress of Angostura on how his proposed system was meant to reflect the way the British parliamentary system works. His proposal for Censors was not for them to act as legislators but rather to act as an office similar to an Ombudsman. As such, some opinions differ on whether his system could truly be classified as a tricameral parliament, considering that the Censors weren't true legislators, but seemed to represent a separate branch of government altogether.

Despite Bolívar's huge influence in South America, no country in the region employs his tricameral parliament. Early attempts to implement the model, such as in Bolivia, were not successful, although the chaos of the period was likely a factor in this outcome. As a result of not adopting Bolívar's British-inspired parliamentary system, numerous celebrated political scientists like the late Juan Linz and many others have observed that the decision of many Latin American countries to model their systems of government on the presidential system of the United States has led to numerous examples of political instability and subsequent descent into dictatorship or chaos.

French tricameralism

Monarchism
Some historians view the French States-General as an example of a tricameral legislature. The States-General evolved gradually over time and provided advice on various matters (including legislative issues) to the King. The three Estates were the simply labeled First (consisting of clergy), Second (consisting of nobility), and Third (consisting of commoners). (The term "fourth estate", referring to the press, derives from this system, but was coined long after the revolution that abolished the States General).

There are two distinct problems with regarding the States-General as a tricameral legislature, however. First, the States-General never had any formal powers to legislate, although, at times, it played a major role in the King's legislative activity. Second, the division between the three estates was not always maintainedthe estates sometimes deliberated separately, but at other times, they deliberated as a single body, undermining the idea of tricameralism.

Consulate
The French Consulate (and later First French Empire, although the lower two chambers were by then entirely without power) had a tricameral legislature, consisting of:

 the Sénat conservateur (Conservative Senate), the highest chamber, whose duty was to guard the constitution, and which upon the consul's proposal could enact special laws known as sénatus-consultes,
 the Corps législatif (Legislative body), successor to the Directoire's Conseil des Anciens (upper house), which was to vote on laws without discussing them (or, after 1804, with only a strictly curtailed discussion),
 the Tribunat (Tribunate), successor of the Directoire's Conseil des Cinq Cents (lower house), which was to discuss laws and only vote on whether to "recommend" them for the Corps législatif.

Whether the Sénat was part of legislature, however, is open to doubt, because Sieyès (the main instigator of the Consulate's Constitution and later president of this Senate) described it as belonging to an altogether different power beyond the executive, legislative and judiciary: the conservative power.  In effect, Napoléon made the Sénat into a political élite to back his power as Consul and later as Emperor, whereas the other two chambers were subdued into submission.  In 1807, the Tribunat was definitely abolished.

Chinese tricameralism
The 1947 Constitution of the Republic of China has three chambers of parliament that are elected. Governmental organs of the constitution follow the outline proposed by Sun Yat-sen and supported by the Kuomintang (Nationalist Party), while also incorporating the opinions of the federalism supporting Communist Party in the 1940s. The separation of powers was designed by Carsun Chang, a founding member of the China Democratic League.

 National Assembly – Directly elected by the people within a county. It represented the entire nation and exercised the political rights thereof. It elected the President and has the power to amend the constitution, but its legislative functions were considered "reserve" powers that were meant to be exercised on an ad-hoc basis.
 Legislative Yuan – Directly elected by the people within a province. It is the principal and standing legislative body. It approves the Premier and supervises the Executive Yuan (the Cabinet).
 Control Yuan – Indirectly elected by the provincial legislatures. It is the government performance auditing body and approves the grand justices of the Judicial Yuan (the Constitutional court) and the commission members of the Examination Yuan (the Civil service commission).

As the mechanism is significantly different from the Western trias politica, the grand justices has an interpretation which ruled that these three organs all bear characteristics equivalent to a "parliament".

However, the government of the Republic of China lost the Chinese Civil War in 1949 and retreated to Taiwan. A set of temporary provisions were passed by the National Assembly to gather more powers to the President and limit the functions of the tricameral parliament. Members of the tricameral parliament elected in China in 1947 and 1948 kept serving on Taiwan without reelection until 1991.

After a series of constitutional amendments in the 1990s in Taiwan, the new set of temporary separate Additional Articles of the Constitution have changed the Legislative Yuan to a unicameral parliament although the tricameral parliament continues to nominally exist. The Control Yuan was made a separate branch of government, while the National Assembly was shut down entirely in June 2005.

European Union
The European Union is sometimes considered to be tricameral, composed of the European Parliament, the European Council, and the European Commission. However, the chambers' powers are different and the Commission is sometimes considered to be an executive branch, resulting in a bicameral system.

Other examples

Roman Republic

The Roman Republic had three legislative assemblies that worked with the Roman Senate of the patrician class. These include:

 Centuriate Assembly (soldiers)
 Plebeian Council (plebeians)
 Tribal Assembly (patricians and plebeians)
 
The Senate and the assemblies worked together to appoint magistrates, enact laws, and territorial holdings issues.

Former Yugoslavia
The Socialist Republic of Croatia, as well as all other federal units of Socialist Federal Republic of Yugoslavia (according to the provisions of the 1974 Constitution) had three houses of parliament (Sabor Socijalističke republike Hrvatske, now Hrvatski sabor): Socio-Political Council (Društveno-političko vijeće), Council of Municipalities (Vijeće općina) and Council of Associated Labor (Vijeće udruženog rada). This was abolished by the new constitution as Croatia gained independence in 1990.

Isle of Man
The parliament of the Isle of Man, Tynwald, is sometimes called tricameral, but this description is not universally accepted. The two branches of Tynwald are the House of Keys and the Legislative Council. The Tynwald Court consists of the members of both houses meeting together regularly. Some argue that this counts as a third house. Others disagree, saying that as there are no members of the Court who are not also members of the other houses, the Court should not be considered separately (by comparison, in Australia, Switzerland and India deadlocks between the two Houses can sometimes be resolved by a joint sitting. It is a matter of semantics whether or not such arrangements are described as "tricameral". (Taking the expression literally, Tynwald is tricameral in that there are three separate chambers (rooms) in use for the sessions.)

Church of England
The General Synod of the Church of England is sometimes described as tricameral. It is divided into a House of Bishops, the House of Clergy and the House of Laity. As the Church of England is the state church of England, the Parliament of the United Kingdom has given the General Synod the power (subject to veto) to make law relating to the Church.

Medieval Ireland
In the fifteenth century, secular clergy of each diocese sent two proctors to the Parliament of Ireland, who met separately from the House of Commons and the House of Lords. In 1537, their right to membership was revoked after they opposed the Reformation in Ireland.

Labor unions
Tricameral meeting arrangements are a growing trend in labor unions where some members will always be working on one of three shifts. Under such arrangements, each shift will have its own meeting, but the action of one meeting will have to be adopted by the other two.

Queen's University

The governing authority of Queen's University at Kingston principally follows a bicameral structure commonly seen in Canadian universities, with split primarily between a Board of Trustees and a Senate, each of which has exclusive authority over non-academic and academic matters. This arrangement is found at a number of other Canadian universities, such as the University of Waterloo.

Queen's University, however, additionally has a University Council with advisory and ceremonial functions, including the appointment of the university Chancellor (a purely ceremonial position). Although the University Council does not have any real power to govern the university, it has exclusive power to determine its own composition and the selection of its members, meaning it is not subordinate to the Board and/or Senate. The University Council was made by the Parliament of Canada and only there can it be unmade.

See also
Three estates

References

External links
An overview of South Africa's 1983 constitution
An overview of Bolivar's model government

Legislatures